WSFM may refer to:

Media
 WSFM-LP, a radio station in Asheville, North Carolina, United States  
 WSFM 101.7 or 101.7 WSFM, a free-to-air commercial radio station in Sydney, Australia, providing very short-edited hit music.
 WSFM (internet), an internet radio station in the UK as streaming MP3
 WAZO, a radio station in Southport, North Carolina, United States formerly known as WSFM from 1988 to 2004
 WUIN (FM), a radio station in Oak Island, North Carolina, United States known as WSFM from 2004 to 2011
 WLTT, a defunct radio station (1180 AM) formerly licensed to serve Carolina Beach, North Carolina, United States which held the call sign WSFM from 2011 to 2013
 WHKF, a radio station licensed to Harrisburg, Pennsylvania, United States which held the call sign WSFM from 1965 until the 1980s

Other
 Web Services Formal Methods
 Western State Fire Managers
 Wisconsin State Firefighters Memorial
 World Swim For Malaria